The 2009 National Club Baseball Association (NCBA) Division II World Series was played at Pullman Park in Butler, PA from May 15 to May 19. The second tournament's champion was the University of Kentucky, who won their second consecutive Division II title.

As of 2014, Kentucky is the only school to repeat as NCBA Division II National Champions.  The only other school to repeat as NCBA World Series Champions in any division is Colorado State, who won three straight titles from 2004–06 and again from 2008-10 in Division I.

Format
The format is similar to the NCAA College World Series in that eight teams participate in two four-team double elimination brackets with a couple differences.  One being that in the NCBA, there is only one game that decides the national championship rather than a best-of-3 like the NCAA.  Another difference which is between NCBA Division I and II is that Division II games are 7 innings while Division I games are 9 innings.

Participants
Coastal Carolina
Hofstra
Kentucky
LSC-Kingwood
Penn State†
Southern Illinois
VCU
Wyoming
<small>†-denotes school also fields an NCBA Division I team

Results

Bracket

Game Results

Championship Game

See also
2009 NCBA Division I World Series

Notes
VCU's victory of Hofstra in the first round set NCBA Division II World Series records for most runs scored by a single team in one game (20) and the largest margin of victory (18) in a NCBA Division II World Series game.  Those records still stand as of 2014.
Kentucky became the first and currently only school to repeat as NCBA Division II National Champions.  Unless a team wins a title that fields both a Division I and II team, Kentucky will likely be the only repeat champion for quite a while because of new rules regarding automatic promotion to Division I for Division II teams that began on 7/1/13 which includes a team winning the NCBA Division II World Series.

References

Baseball in Pennsylvania
2009 in baseball
National Club Baseball Association
NCBA Division II World Series